Henleaze is a northern suburb of the city of Bristol in South West England.

It is an almost entirely residential inter-war development, with Edwardian streets on its southern fringes. Its main neighbours are Westbury on Trym, Horfield, Bishopston and Redland. 

Until 2016 Henleaze was the name of a ward for Bristol City Council, which included Golden Hill and Westbury Park as well as Henleaze.  Henleaze is now part of the Westbury-on-Trym and Henleaze ward.

History
The name of Henleaze probably derives from a Robert Henley, who in 1659 bought a property which became known as Henley's House and later as Henleaze Park. The area was a rural part of the parish of Westbury on Trym until 1896, when land between Henleaze Road and Durdham Down was sold for development. Most of the rest of the area was developed in the 1920s.

Politics
Henleaze is in the Bristol North West constituency, and the MP for the area is Darren Jones, for Labour. There are three seats on Bristol City Council for the Westbury-on-Trym & Henleaze ward, one held by Liberal Democrats and two by the Conservatives as of the 2016 elections. Up until the early 1990s, it was a solid Conservative area, however The Liberal Democrats established a more solid position up until 2006, when it began to swing back to the Conservatives. In the 2009 elections, when the Liberal Democrats took control of the City Council, Liz Radford a local campaigner achieved an unprecedented swing in the ward for the Conservatives. Henleaze would have fallen to them if the swing had been just 1.5% higher.

Henleaze is one of the most affluent areas of the city. Among the thirty-five wards into which Bristol is divided, it had the fifth lowest proportion of people in routine and semi-routine occupations, according to the 2001 census, and the fifth highest proportion with higher education qualifications.

Amenities
Henleaze Lake, a flooded former quarry on the northern edge of Henleaze near Southmead and Westbury on Trym, is owned by the Charity (No 1132633) "Henleaze Swimming Club" since 2009 and celebrated its Centenary in 2019 

The other former quarry was filled in and made into a park, now known as Old Quarry Park. It was recently renovated with the help of a grant from the National Lottery for the provision of play equipment, seating and flower beds.

Henleaze also features newsagents, bakeries, supermarkets and charity-shops, as well as a library, the Orpheus cinema which is run by 'King' Harold and Scott Cinemas and the Den (Est 2007). Henleaze Old Boys Cricket Club was formed in 2005 and play at the neighbouring Golden Hill Cricket ground. The membership of the club is primarily former Henleaze Junior School pupils. There is also a thriving Tennis Club based in Tennessee Grove with 4 outdoor courts and planning permission for floodlighting one has recently been granted.

Churches
Henleaze parish church, St Peter's, was designed and built in 1926 by A. V. Gough. Trinity-Henleaze United Reformed Church was built in 1907 (as Henleaze Congregational Church) and designed by Frank Wills, who designed many Bristol churches.

Listed buildings
St Ursula's High School in Brecon Road dates from the mid 19th century and is grade II listed.
12 The Drive, Greystone House is grade II listed.
The Old Lodge built circa 1810 is grade II listed.
Shown under Listed Buildings and Structures 10 metres south of 14 Eastfield Local Hand Pump - Mid C19 cast iron. Round shaft and a long curved handle with a ball end is grade II listed.
20 Eastfield is grade II listed.
10 Eastfield is grade II listed.

References

External links

 The Henleaze Book
 The Henleaze Society
 Map of Henleaze circa 1900

Areas of Bristol